Kvernhøi is a mountain in Øystre Slidre Municipality in Innlandet county, Norway. The mountain is surrounded by several other notable mountains including Heimdalshøe to the north, Gråhøi to the northeast, Bitihorn to the southwest, and Raslet to the west. The lake Vinstre lies to the south. The mountain sits on the eastern edge of the Valdresflye plateau.

See also
List of mountains of Norway by height

References

Øystre Slidre
Mountains of Innlandet